St. Anthony Hall, also known as the fraternity of Delta Psi, was founded at Columbia University on January 17, 1847, and has eleven active chapters. The active chapters are Brown University, Columbia University, Massachusetts Institute of Technology (MIT), Princeton University, Trinity College, University of Mississippi, University of North Carolina at Chapel Hill (UNC), University of Pennsylvania, University of Rochester, University of Virginia (UVA), and Yale University.

Defunct chapters include Burlington College (New Jersey), Cumberland University, New York University, Randolph-Macon College, Rutgers College, South Carolina College, Washington and Lee University (W&L) and Williams College.

Notable members

Architecture

Arts

Athletics

Business and industry

Clergy

Diplomacy and government

Education

Law and judiciary

Media and entertainment

Medicine and science

Military

Nonprofits

Politicians

Writers and journalists

See also
 Collegiate secret societies in North America

References

Lists of members of United States student societies
members